Deepak Rao is an Indian military trainer and author. He has helped train the Indian Army, Navy, Air Force as well as police forces of major cities and states, for more than 17 years without compensation. For his service in modernization of close quarter battle training, he was awarded commission as Honorary Major of the Indian Territorial Army in 2011. He is acting as a Brand Ambassadors of the Indian Army.

Rao has been a trainer for the Indian Army since 1994. He specializes in close-quarters combat, and along with his wife, Seema Rao, invented a new form of reflex shooting, named the Rao System of Reflex Fire, for the Indian Army. Rao is a qualified physician who practices sports medicine.

According to Rao's instructor Richard Bustillo, an original student of Bruce Lee, Rao is one of the few instructors in India who teach Bruce Lee's art of Jeet Kune Do correctly.

Rao has co-authored two books with his wife—A Comprehensive Analysis of World Terrorism and The Encyclopaedia of Close Combat Operations; the latter was distributed to the Police and Paramilitary for free by the Home Ministry.

References

External links 
 

Living people
Year of birth missing (living people)
Indian Army officers
Indian Jeet Kune Do practitioners